The Golconda Mine, in the area of Lake City, Colorado, was a historic silver mine.

It was listed on the National Register of Historic Places in 1999.  The listed property included one contributing building and one contributing site.

A historic log building survives.

References

Log buildings and structures on the National Register of Historic Places in Colorado
National Register of Historic Places in Hinsdale County, Colorado
Buildings and structures completed in 1877
Silver mines in the United States
1877 establishments in Colorado